David Cormand (born 30 November 1974) is a French politician who was elected as a Member of the European Parliament (MEP) in 2019. A member of Europe Ecology – The Greens (EELV), he was its national secretary from 2016 to 2019. Cormand also served as a regional councillor of Haute-Normandie from 2007 to 2015 and a municipal councillor of Canteleu from 2001 until 2020.

Political career
In the European Parliament, Cormand has served on the Committee on Budgets and the Committee on the Internal Market and Consumer Protection. In 2020, he also joined the Special Committee on Artificial Intelligence in a Digital Age. 

In addition to his committee assignments, Cormand is part of the European Parliament's delegations with the Korean Peninsula and to the ACP–EU Joint Parliamentary Assembly. He is also a member of the European Parliament Intergroup on the Welfare and Conservation of Animals.

References

1974 births
Living people
People from Mont-Saint-Aignan
Politicians from Normandy
University of Rouen Normandy alumni
MEPs for France 2019–2024
Europe Ecology – The Greens MEPs
Europe Ecology – The Greens politicians
Regional councillors of France